Esmari van Reenen (born September 28, 1981) is a South African sport shooter. She won the silver medal for the rifle three positions at the 2006 Commonwealth Games in Melbourne, Australia, losing out by seven tenths of a point (0.7) to India's Anuja Jung. Van Reenen received a qualifying place for the Olympics by capturing the gold in the same category at the 2007 ISSF African Shooting Championships in Cairo, Egypt. She also achieved a best result in the international stage by finishing fifth at the 2008 ISSF World Cup in Rio de Janeiro, with a score of 673.3 points.

Van Reenen became one of the first female sport shooters to represent South Africa at the 2008 Summer Olympics in Beijing. She competed in the women's 50 m rifle 3 positions, where she was able to shoot 198 targets in a prone position, 183 in standing, and 197 in kneeling, for a total score of 578 points, finishing only in sixteenth place.

References

External links
ISSF Profile
NBC Olympics Profile

South African female sport shooters
Living people
Olympic shooters of South Africa
Shooters at the 2008 Summer Olympics
Shooters at the 2002 Commonwealth Games
Shooters at the 2006 Commonwealth Games
Commonwealth Games silver medallists for South Africa
1981 births
Commonwealth Games medallists in shooting
21st-century South African women
Medallists at the 2002 Commonwealth Games